Good News Radio 103.9 is a Christian radio station broadcast in Ballarat, Australia. It was established in 1993 to serve the community
by providing a Christian radio broadcasting.

Some of the stations most popular shows are King’s Business and Aiden G On The Radio. 

It has programs for all ages, kids, youth, adult and the older generation are all covered.

References

External links 

Good News Radio website 

 

Radio stations in Ballarat